May Hosiery Mills Knitting Mill is a historic building that was built as an early 20th-century hosiery knitting mill in Burlington, Alamance County, North Carolina. Built in 1928, it is listed on the National Register of Historic Places.

History 

The knitting mill was built by William and Benjamin May in the first half of the 1900s. The structure consists of one-story-on-partial basement which is built with brick and reinforced concrete. A distinctive sawtooth roof is a prominent feature of this building which depicts an early 20th century textile mill design.

References 

Historic districts on the National Register of Historic Places in North Carolina
Buildings and structures in Burlington, North Carolina
National Register of Historic Places in Alamance County, North Carolina
Buildings and structures completed in 1928